The Makino River is a river of the east of New Zealand's North Island. It flows northeast from the Kaweka Range as one of the headwaters of the Mohaka River. The Makino's entire length is within Kaweka Forest Park.

See also
List of rivers of New Zealand

References

Rivers of the Hawke's Bay Region
Rivers of New Zealand